Papillary eccrine adenoma  is a cutaneous condition characterized by an uncommon benign sweat gland neoplasm that presents as a dermal nodule located primarily on the extremities of black patients.

See also 
 Syringadenoma papilliferum
 Skin lesion

References

Further reading 
 

Epidermal nevi, neoplasms, and cysts